Kowa Chiefdom is a chiefdom in Moyamba District of Sierra Leone. Its capital is Njama.

References 

Chiefdoms of Sierra Leone
Southern Province, Sierra Leone